The TN 61 was a French nuclear warhead.

It was a lighter weight version of the TN 60 warhead and quickly replaced it in service on the M20 SLBMs on the Redoutable class SSBNs. The TN 61 was also used on the SSBS S3D IRBM missiles. The 1 to 1.2 megaton yield weapon was in service between 1977 and 1991.

References
Norris, Robert, Burrows, Andrew, Fieldhouse, Richard "Nuclear Weapons Databook, Volume V, British, French and Chinese Nuclear Weapons, San Francisco, Westview Press, 1994, 

Nuclear warheads of France
Military equipment introduced in the 1970s